is the debut single by the Japanese hit duo Pink Lady. The single was released on August 25, 1976, under the Victor label. "Pepper Keibu" reached a peak chart position of number four, with a total of 1,050,000 sales. The titular song won the duo the Newcomer Award at the 18th Japan Record Awards. It was also nominated for the Best New Artist Award, but lost to "Omoide Boro Boro" by Yasuko Naitō. The original recording did not have the signature "Pepper Keibu yo" at the end, as the live performances did. Subsequent recordings and covers do, however, include the line. A number of reissues have been made, including 8 cm and 12 cm CD versions.

According to Oricon, this was the 14th best selling single from 1977.

At the time of the song's release, songwriter Yū Aku was often asked if it was inspired by the Lockheed bribery scandal in Japan, as the arrest of Prime Minister Kakuei Tanaka was fresh in the public's memories. Aku responded by saying the song took inspiration from Inspector Clouseau from The Pink Panther series, as well as Shirō Sone's song , Rakugo's , soft drinks such as Dr Pepper, and The Beatles' album Sgt. Pepper's Lonely Hearts Club Band.

Pink Lady also recorded an English-language version titled "Sergeant Pepper" in 1978 for international markets. This version also included an English version of "Wanted".

A re-recorded version of the song was included on the 2-disc greatest hits release, INNOVATION, released in December 2010.

Track listing (7" vinyl)
All lyrics are written by Yū Aku; all music is composed and arranged by Shunichi Tokura.

Chart positions

Morning Musume version 

A cover of "Pepper Keibu" was released by the idol pop group Morning Musume as a single on September 24, 2008 under the Zetima label to promote their upcoming ninth album, Cover You, a tribute to producer Yū Aku. The Single V DVD of the single was released on October 22, 2008. The single was their first cover single since "Morning Musume no Hyokkori Hyōtanjima" more than five-and-a-half years before. The single peaked at #3 on the Oricon weekly chart, charting for six weeks. The single was released in three editions, a limited A coming with a DVD, a limited B comes in special packaging with a 40-page photo booklet and a regular edition. Reina Tanaka and Sayumi Michishige are the only members to receive solo lines in the song.

Track listings

Members at time of single 
 5th generation: Ai Takahashi, Risa Niigaki
 6th generation: Eri Kamei, Sayumi Michishige, Reina Tanaka
 7th generation: Koharu Kusumi
 8th generation: Aika Mitsui, Junjun, Linlin

Oricon ranks and sales

Other cover versions
1990: performed live by Chisato Moritaka as part of her Pink Lady Medley in the concert video Moritaka Land Tour 1990.3.3 at NHK Hall, released on Blu-ray in 2013.
1993: sung by Yūji Oda in the film Sotsugyō Ryokō: Nihon Kara Kimashita.
1995: sung by Noriko Sakai in a Toshiba air conditioner commercial.
2001: parodied by Norika Fujiwara and Sayo Aizawa for a JAL commercial promoting bargain fares.
2002: covered by GO!GO!7188 on their album Tora no Ana.
2002: covered by Trasparenza in their album Pink Lady Euro Tracks.
2006: covered in Chinese by Saiyū Meimei for a Suntory Oolong tea commercial.
2007: covered by Sayuri Ishikawa on her album Nijusseiki no Meikyoku-tachi.
2008: covered by Mizrock, included on the tribute album Ga-Ki (Yū Aku Tribute). 
2009: covered by Atsuko Kurusu and Tomomi Miyauchi on the tribute album Bad Friends.
2011: covered by DJ Sasa & Pink Beat Bop on the album "Pink Reggae (ピンク・レゲエ)".
2015: parodied by Mizuki Yamamoto and Rikako Sakata for an Aoki Holdings commercial.
2015: incorporated by Amiaya as part of their "Pink Lady Mash Up 2015" single.
2016: covered by the tribute group Pink Babies in their "Nagisa no Sindbad" Type-D single.

References

External links 
 
 
 
 "Pepper Keibu" (Morning Musume) entry on the Up-Front Works official website

1976 debut singles
1976 songs
2008 singles
Pink Lady (band) songs
Japanese-language songs
Disco songs
Songs with lyrics by Yū Aku
Songs with music by Shunichi Tokura
Victor Entertainment singles
Morning Musume songs
Zetima Records singles